Vasile Bahnaru (born October 24, 1949, Micleuşeni) is a philologist from the Republic of Moldova.

Biography 

Vasile Bahnaru was a founder of the Popular Front of Moldova. He was a member of the Commission for the Study of the Communist Dictatorship in Moldova, and currently is the acting director of the Academy's Philology Institute.

Awards 
 "Grigore Vieru" Prize of the Academy of Sciences of Moldova; the Prize worth 30,000 lei.

Works 
 The monograph “Elements of Romanian Semasiology”.

External links 
50 de personalităţi ale epocee 87-89
Vasile BAHNARU - 60 years
 Preşedintele interimar al Republicii Moldova Mihai Ghimpu a emis un decret prezidenţial privind constituirea Comisiei pentru studierea şi aprecierea regimului comunist totalitar din Republica Moldova.
Moldovan authorities going to condemn communist regime…
Hundreds of thousands of cases to be examined by commission for combating Communism
 http://www.privesc.eu/?p=1884 - The first press conference of the Commission, Moldpress, January 18, 2010. Video.
 https://web.archive.org/web/20100309165120/http://www.timpul.md/article/2010/01/18/5881 - interview with Gheorghe Cojocaru, president of the Commission.
 Vladimir Tismăneanu, Un moment istoric: Comisia de studiere a comunismului
 Site-ul Parlamentului Republicii Moldova

References

1949 births
Living people
Moldova State University alumni
20th-century Moldovan historians
Popular Front of Moldova politicians
Members of the Commission for the Study of the Communist Dictatorship in Moldova
Recipients of the Order of the Republic (Moldova)